Anselm Paul Alexis Hollo (12 April 1934 – 29 January 2013) was a Finnish poet and translator. He lived in the United States from 1967 until his death in January 2013.

Hollo published more than forty titles of poetry in the United Kingdom and in the United States, with a style strongly influenced by the American beat poets.

Personal life
Paavo Anselm Aleksis Hollo was born in Helsinki, Finland. His father, Juho August Hollo (1885–1967) — who liked to be known as "J. A." Hollo — was professor of pedagogy at the University of Helsinki, an essayist, and a major translator of literature into Finnish. His mother was Iris Antonina Anna Walden (1899–1983), a music teacher and daughter of organic chemist Paul Walden. He lived for eight years in the United Kingdom and had three children, Hannes, Kaarina, and Tamsin, with his first wife, poet Josephine Clare. He was a permanent resident in the United States from the late 1960s until his death. At the time of his death, he resided in Boulder, Colorado with his second wife, artist Jane Dalrymple-Hollo.

Career
In the 1960s Hollo lived in London and worked at the Finnish section of BBC World Service. One of his tasks there was to write radio dramas in Finnish, together with another Finnish poet, Matti Rossi. The music to their productions was written by Erkki Toivanen.

Around this time he was also beginning to make a name for himself as a poet in the English language. In 1965, Hollo performed at the "underground" International Poetry Incarnation, London. Also in the same year, the first customer of the Indica Bookshop, a certain Paul McCartney, is known to have bought, among other things, the book & it is a song by Anselm Hollo the day before the bookshop was officially opened.

In 2001, poets and critics associated with the SUNY Buffalo POETICS list elected Hollo to the honorary position of "anti-laureate", in protest at the appointment of Billy Collins to the position of Poet Laureate Consultant in Poetry to the Library of Congress.

Hollo translated poetry and belles-lettres from Finnish, German, Swedish, and French into English. He was one of the early translators of Allen Ginsberg into German and Finnish.

Hollo taught creative writing in eighteen different institutions of higher learning, including SUNY Buffalo, the Iowa Writers' Workshop, and the University of Colorado at Boulder. Since 1985, he taught in the Jack Kerouac School of Disembodied Poetics at Naropa University, where he held the rank of Full Professor.

Several of his poems have been set into music by pianist and composer Frank Carlberg. Poets Ted Berrigan and Alice Notley named their son Anselm Berrigan after Hollo.

Hollo became ill during the summer of 2012 and had brain surgery. Hollo died from post-operative pneumonia on 29 January 2013 at the age of 78.

Awards 
 1979 NEA and Poets Foundation fellowships
 1996 Gertrude Stein Award in Innovative American Poetry 1995–1996
 1996 Finnish State Award for Foreign Translators
 2001 best book of poems Award by the San Francisco Poetry Center, for Notes on the Possibilities and Attractions of Existence: New and Selected Poems 1965–2000
 2004 Harold Morton Landon Translation Award

Selected publications 
 Sateiden välillä, runoja. Otava, Helsinki 1956
 & (And) what else is new : a small pamphlet. New voice, Chatham, Kent 1963
 Jazz poems. Vista Books, London 1963
 & (And) it is a song : poems. Migrant Press, Birmingham 1965
 Faces & Forms: Poems. Ambit, London 1965
 Word from the north : new poetry from Finland, edited, translated and introduction by Anselm Hollo. Blackburn London : Lancs., Poetmeat : Strangers press 1965
 The claim. Goliard Press, London 1966

Alembic Trigram Press 1972

Finite Continued, Blue Wind Press 1980

Anthologies

See also

The Czar's Madman

References

External links 
 The Anti-Laureate Announcement
 Poems online at Samizdat (poetry magazine)
 "Add-Verse" a poetry-photo-video project Hollo participated in
 Poetry Foundation announcement of Hollo's death

1934 births
2013 deaths
Writers from Helsinki
Finnish expatriates in the United States 

Finnish male poets
Beat Generation writers
Iowa Writers' Workshop faculty
Naropa University faculty
Translators to English
Camp Rising Sun alumni
Finnish writers
20th-century Finnish people
20th-century translators
20th-century Finnish poets
English-language poets
20th-century male writers
Deaths from pneumonia in Colorado